The Transportation Act of 1958 attempted to reinvigorate the commercial railroads of the United States by granting the Interstate Commerce Commission money to loan to railroads and power to fix prices.   Despite this, railroads were still having a difficult time remaining profitable, and asked to shed services, particularly passenger rail services.

1958 in American law
1958
United States railroad regulation
1958 in rail transport
85th United States Congress